Berdoba is a village in the Ennedi-Est region of Chad. It is the birthplace of former president Idriss Déby.

References

Populated places in Chad